Sir Maurice Edward Dockrell (21 December 1850 – 5 August 1929) was an Irish businessman and politician from Dublin.

At the 1918 general election, he was elected as Irish Unionist Alliance Member of Parliament for Dublin Rathmines from 1918 to 1922.

The 1918 election was a watershed in Ireland. Following the Easter Rising in 1916, Sinn Féin had grown in popularity, eclipsing the Irish Parliamentary Party.  Sinn Féin candidates treated the election as an Irish general election, pledging not to take their seats in the British House of Commons, but to unilaterally establish a separate parliament in Dublin.

At the election, the Dublin University constituency returned two Unionists, and Dockrell was the only other Irish Unionist returned outside Ulster.  Rather than joining Sinn Féin in the First Dáil, Dockrell took his seat in the House of Commons of the United Kingdom.

His wife, Margaret Dockrell was a suffragist, philanthropist, and councillor. His son Henry Morgan Dockrell was later a Fine Gael Teachta Dála (TD), and his grandsons Percy and Maurice Dockrell were also long-serving Fine Gael TDs.

Maurice ran the Dockrell family business of builders' providers in Dublin.

Early life and family

Maurice was the son of Thomas Dockrell and Anne Morgan Brooks. He was the fifth of 10 children. 3 of his siblings died in childhood and are buried with his parents in Mount Jerome Cemetery.

Marriage and family

Maurice married Margaret Dockrell on 27th July 1875 in Dublin Ireland. They had 7 children. 

 Thomas Edward Dockrell (02 Jan 1878 - 16 Jan 1915) 
 Henry Morgan Dockrell (17 Apr 1880 - 26 Oct 1955)
 Maurice Dockrell (abt 1883)
 James Dockrell (abt 1884 - 30 Aug 1888)
 George Dockrell (22 Oct 1886 - 23 Dec 1924)
 Kenneth Brooks Dockrell (09 Jan 1888 - 11 Mar 1937)
 Anna Dorothy Dockrell (Abt. 1890 - 24 Jan 1976)

See also

Families in the Oireachtas

References

External links

 
 

1850 births
1929 deaths
Businesspeople from County Dublin
Irish knights
Irish Unionist Party MPs
Members of the Parliament of the United Kingdom for County Dublin constituencies (1801–1922)
Politicians from County Dublin
UK MPs 1918–1922